Albertochampsa is an extinct genus of globidontan alligatoroid (possibly a stem-caiman) from the Late Cretaceous of Alberta. It was named in 1972 by Bruce Erickson, and the type species is A. langstoni. It is known from a skull from the Campanian-age Dinosaur Park Formation, where it was rare; Leidyosuchus is the most commonly found crocodilian at the Park. The skull of Albertochampsa was only about 21 cm long (8.3 in).

References

Crocodilians
Late Cretaceous crocodylomorphs of North America
Late Cretaceous reptiles of North America
Fossil taxa described in 1972
Prehistoric pseudosuchian genera